The 1976 Estonian SSR Football Championship was won by Dvigatel.

League table

References

Estonian Football Championship
Est
Football